The 2019–20 1. FC Nürnberg season is the 120th season in the club's football history, having been relegated from the Bundesliga in the previous season. The season covers a period from 1 July 2019 to 30 June 2020.

Players

Review and events
In 2019–20 the club plays in the 2. Bundesliga.

The club also took part in the 2019–20 edition of the DFB-Pokal, the German Cup.

Friendly matches

Competitions

2. Bundesliga

League table

Matches

Relegation play-offs

DFB-Pokal

Overall

Sources

External links
 2019–20 1. FC Nürnberg season at Weltfussball.de 
 2019–20 1. FC Nürnberg season at kicker.de 
 2019–20 1. FC Nürnberg season at Fussballdaten.de 

Nuremberg
1. FC Nürnberg seasons